Jessie Alexander  (2 June 1876 – 27 March 1962) was a New Zealand Presbyterian deaconess and missionary. She was born in Brantford, Ontario, Canada, on 2 June 1876.

In the 1947 New Year Honours, Alexander was appointed a Member of the Order of the British Empire, for social welfare work with Māori children.

Alexander died in Auckland on 27 March 1962, and she was buried at Purewa Cemetery.

References

1876 births
1962 deaths
Burials at Purewa Cemetery
Canadian emigrants to New Zealand
Female Christian missionaries
New Zealand Members of the Order of the British Empire
New Zealand Presbyterian missionaries
People from Brantford